King parrot may refer to:

Common name of species 
 Red-capped parrot (Purpureicephalus spurius), a regional name in Western Australia
 Alisterus 
 Australian king parrot (Alisterus scapularis), found in eastern Australia
 Papuan king parrot (A. chloropterus) in Papua
 Moluccan king parrot (A. amboinensis) in Moluccas and other Indonesian islands.

Other 
 King Parrot (band), Australian band
 King Parrot Creek, stream in Victoria, Australia